The  was a life-insurance company in Japan. Yamato's headquarters were in Uchisaiwaichō, Chiyoda, Tokyo. It was founded on September 20, 1889, and was capitalized at ¥12,086,963,000. It has policies valued at ¥34,500,000,000.

The company filed for bankruptcy on October 10, 2008 after the global financial crisis significantly devalued its assets  particularly mortgages in Nevada. Its assets would later be acquired by the American-based insurance company Prudential Financial.

References

External links

Yamato Life site  (Archived)

Financial services companies established in 1889
Insurance companies based in Tokyo
Companies that have filed for bankruptcy in Japan